Leucanopsis stipulata is a moth of the family Erebidae. It was described by Walter Rothschild in 1909. It is found in Bolivia, Guyana, Peru and Costa Rica.

References

stipulata
Moths described in 1909